Ivica Žunić (born 11 September 1988) is a Croatian football player who plays as a centre back.

Club career

Volyn Lutsk
On 24 July 2014, Žunić joined Ukrainian club Volyn Lutsk.

Orenburg
On 6 July 2016, Žunić signed for Russian Premier League newcomers FC Orenburg.

Chornomorets Odessa
On 18 August 2017, Žunić joined Ukrainian club Chornomorets Odessa.

Gabala
On 19 July 2019, Žunić signed six-month contract with Gabala.

CFR Cluj
On 22 November 2020, joined Romanian club CFR Cluj. He made his debut on the same day the Romanian club announced his signing, coming on as a substitute for Ciobotariu in the 87th minute in a 0–1 lose over UTA Arad.

Rapid București
On 12 January 2021, Rapid București announced the signing of Žunić from CFR Cluj on a one-and-half-year contract.

Honours

Club
CFR Cluj
Liga I: 2019-20, 2020-21

References

External links
 
 

1988 births
Living people
People from Jajce
Croats of Bosnia and Herzegovina
Association football central defenders
Croatian footballers
1. Simmeringer SC players
SV Stegersbach players
GKS Tychy players
FC Volyn Lutsk players
FC Orenburg players
FC Chornomorets Odesa players
FC Atyrau players
Gabala FC players
CFR Cluj players
FC Rapid București players
2. Liga (Austria) players
Austrian Regionalliga players
I liga players
Ukrainian Premier League players
Russian Premier League players
Kazakhstan Premier League players
Azerbaijan Premier League players
Liga I players
Liga II players
Croatian expatriate footballers
Expatriate footballers in Austria
Expatriate footballers in Poland
Expatriate footballers in Ukraine
Expatriate footballers in Russia
Expatriate footballers in Kazakhstan
Expatriate footballers in Azerbaijan
Expatriate footballers in Romania
Croatian expatriate sportspeople in Austria
Croatian expatriate sportspeople in Poland
Croatian expatriate sportspeople in Ukraine
Croatian expatriate sportspeople in Russia
Croatian expatriate sportspeople in Kazakhstan
Croatian expatriate sportspeople in Azerbaijan
Croatian expatriate sportspeople in Romania